Saigu Choseichi  is an earthfill dam located in Mie Prefecture in Japan. The dam is used for irrigation. The catchment area of the dam is 0.7 km2. The dam impounds about 30  ha of land when full and can store 2002 thousand cubic meters of water. The construction of the dam was started on 1993 and completed in 2011.

See also
List of dams in Japan

References

Dams in Mie Prefecture